Rita Durão (born 21 January 1976 in Lisbon) is a Portuguese actress. She has appeared in more than thirty films since 1996.

Selected filmography

Awards
Shooting Stars Award (2000)

References

External links 

 Biography (in Portuguese)

1976 births
Living people
Portuguese film actresses
20th-century Portuguese actresses
21st-century Portuguese actresses